The following outline is provided as an overview of and topical guide to the Sahrawi Arab Democratic Republic:

Sahrawi Arab Democratic Republic (SADR) – partially recognised state that claims sovereignty over the entire territory of Western Sahara, is a former Spanish colony. The SADR was proclaimed by the Polisario Front on February 27, 1976, in Bir Lehlou, Western Sahara. The SADR government controls about 20-25% of the territory it claims. It calls the territories under its control the Liberated Territories or the Free Zone. Morocco controls and administers the rest of the disputed territory and calls this area its Southern Provinces. The United Nations and the SADR government considers the Moroccan-controlled territory to be an occupied territory.

General reference 
 Pronunciation:  
 Common English country name: Western Sahara
 Official English country name: The Sahrawi Arab Democratic Republic
 Common endonyms
  – 
 
 Official endonym(s):  
 Adjectival(s):
 Demonym(s):
 Etymology: Name of the Sahrawi Arab Democratic Republic
 ISO country codes:  See the Outline of Western Sahara
 ISO region codes:  See the Outline of Western Sahara
 Internet country code top-level domain:  See the Outline of Western Sahara

Geography of the Sahrawi Arab Democratic Republic 

Geography of the Sahrawi Arab Democratic Republic
 Sahrawi Arab Democratic Republic is: a republic in exile, holding but a small portion of the territory they claim
 Location
 Sahrawi Arab Democratic Republic is situated within the following regions of the world:
 Northern Hemisphere and Western Hemisphere
 Africa
 Sahara Desert
 North Africa
 Western Sahara
 Territory claimed: Western Sahara
 Territory held: Free Zone
 Location of most of the citizens in exile: Sahrawi refugee camps (self-managed camps in Tindouf Province, Algeria)
 Time zone:  Coordinated Universal Time UTC+00
 Atlas of the Sahrawi Arab Democratic Republic

Environment of Western Sahara 

Environment of Western Sahara
 Climate of Western Sahara
 Ecoregions in Western Sahara
 Wildlife of Western Sahara
 Fauna of Western Sahara
 Birds of Western Sahara
 Mammals of Western Sahara

Natural geographic features of Western Sahara 

Landforms in Western Sahara
 Deserts in Western Sahara
 Sahara
 Glaciers in Western Sahara: none 
 World Heritage Sites in Western Sahara: None

Administrative divisions of the Sahrawi Arab Democratic Republic 

Regions of Western Sahara
 Free Zone – area that lies between the Moroccan Wall and the border with Algeria.
 Sahrawi refugee camps – self-managed camps in Tindouf Province, Algeria
 The SADR claims the rest of Western Sahara, but the portion west of the Moroccan Wall is occupied by Morocco.
 Provinces of Western Sahara
 Districts of Western Sahara

Municipalities of the Sahrawi Arab Democratic Republic 
 Capital of the Sahrawi Arab Democratic Republic:
Tifariti – temporary capital and headquarters of the Polisario Front
El Aaiún (de jure)  – headquarters of Moroccan occupation, but still considered by the SADR to be its true capital
 Towns within the Free Zone, administered by the Sahrawi Arab Democratic Republic
 Tifariti  – temporary capital and headquarters of the Polisario Front 
 Bir Lehlou  former temporary capital
 Meharrize 
 Zug
 Dougaj
 Agounit 
 Mijek (Miyek)
 For the rest of the cities and towns within Western Sahara claimed by the SADR, see List of cities in Western Sahara

Government and politics of the Sahrawi Arab Democratic Republic 

Politics of the Sahrawi Arab Democratic Republic
Politics of Western Sahara

State
Polisario
Popular Front for the Liberation of Saguia el Hamra and Rio de Oro
Western Sahara Authority
Sahrawi Arab Democratic Republic
 Capital of the Sahrawi Arab Democratic Republic:
Tifariti – temporary provincial capital
El Aaiún – claimed capital of the SADR, occupied by Morocco
Tindouf, Algeria
Bir Lehlou – temporary capital of the SADR

Elections
 Elections in the Sahrawi Arab Democratic Republic
 Sahrawi legislative election, 2008
 Political parties in the Sahrawi Arab Democratic Republic
 International recognition of the Sahrawi Arab Democratic Republic
 Former members of the Polisario Front

Branches of the government of the Sahrawi Arab Democratic Republic 

Government of the Sahrawi Arab Democratic Republic

Executive branch of the government of the Sahrawi Arab Democratic Republic 
 Head of state: President of the Sahrawi Arab Democratic Republic, Brahim Ghali
 Head of government: Prime Minister of the Sahrawi Arab Democratic Republic, Bucharaya Hamudi Beyun

Legislative branch of the government of the Sahrawi Arab Democratic Republic 

 Sahrawi National Council

Judicial branch of the government of the Sahrawi Arab Democratic Republic 

 Court system of the Sahrawi Arab Democratic Republic

Foreign relations of the Sahrawi Arab Democratic Republic 

Foreign relations of the Sahrawi Arab Democratic Republic
 International recognition of the Sahrawi Arab Democratic Republic
 Diplomatic missions in the Sahrawi Arab Democratic Republic
 Diplomatic missions of the Sahrawi Arab Democratic Republic
 Relations with Algeria
 Relations with Cuba
 Relations with East Timor
 Relations with Mexico
 Relations with Nigeria
 Relations with Panama
 Relations with South Africa
 Relations with Venezuela

International organization membership 
African Union (AU) 
World Federation of Trade Unions (WFTU)

Law and order in the Sahrawi Arab Democratic Republic 

Law of Western Sahara
 Constitution of the Sahrawi Arab Democratic Republic
 Human rights in the Sahrawi Arab Democratic Republic
 LGBT rights in the Sahrawi Arab Democratic Republic
 Human rights in Western Sahara
 Law enforcement in Western Sahara

Military of the Sahrawi Arab Democratic Republic 

Military of the Sahrawi Arab Democratic Republic
 Command
 Commander-in-chief: Secretary General of the Polisario Front
 Forces
 Army: Sahrawi People's Liberation Army, with 6,000 to 7,000 active troops.
 Navy: none
 Air Force: none

History of the Sahrawi Arab Democratic Republic 

History of Western Sahara
 Hanno the Navigator – Carthaginian explorer c. 500 BC, best known for his naval exploration of the African coast.
 Sanhaja – a nomadic people who were once one of the largest Berber tribal confederations of the Maghreb region.
 Almoravid dynasty – during the 11th century, the Sanhaja tribal confederation allied with the Lamtuna tribe to found the Almoravid dynasty.

 Trans-Saharan trade – throughout history, some trade routes crossed this region, particularly to and from the Ghana Empire during the Middle Ages.

 Spanish Sahara – name used for the modern territory of Western Sahara when it was ruled as a colonial territory by Spain between 1884 and 1975.
 Ifni War – series of armed incursions into Spanish West Africa by Moroccan insurgents and Sahrawi rebels that began in October 1957 and culminated with the abortive siege of Sidi Ifni.
 Polisario Front emerges – formally constituted on May 10, 1973 with the express intention of militarily forcing an end to Spanish colonization.
 El-Ouali Mustapha Sayed – first Secretary General of the Polisario Front.
 Green March – strategic mass demonstration in November 1975, coordinated by the Moroccan government, to force Spain to hand over the disputed, autonomous semi-metropolitan Spanish Province of Sahara to Morocco. The demonstration of some 350,000 Moroccans advanced several miles into the Western Sahara territory, escorted by near 100,000 Moroccan troops (camouflaged as civilians and uniformed), and meeting very little response by the Sahrawi Polisario Front.
 Madrid Accords – treaty between Spain, Morocco, and Mauritania to end the Spanish presence in the territory of Spanish Sahara, which was until the Madrid Accords' inception a Spanish province and former colony.
 Tropas Nómadas – auxiliary regiment to the colonial army in Spanish Sahara composed of Sahrawi tribesmen, equipped with small arms and led by Spanish officers, guarding outposts and sometimes conducting patrols on camelback. Following the Spanish Government's decision to hand over the territory to Morocco and Mauritania towards the end of 1975, numbers of them deserted. Many of the Tropas Nómadas soldiers are believed to have joined Polisario and Spanish-trained fighters formed the core of the Sahrawi People's Liberation Army set up to fight Morocco and Mauritania after the Green March.
 1975 United Nations visiting mission to Spanish Sahara – United Nations General Assembly in 1975 dispatched a visiting mission to the territory and the surrounding countries, in accordance with its resolution 3292 (December 13, 1974), to assist in the decolonization process.
 Western Sahara conflict – ongoing conflict between the Polisario Front of the Sahrawi people and the state of Morocco. The conflict is the continuation of the past insurgency by Polisario against the Spanish colonial forces in 1973-1975 and the subsequent Western Sahara War between the Polisario and Morocco (1975–1991).
 Western Sahara War – armed struggle between the Sahrawi Polisario Front and Morocco between 1975 and 1991, being the most significant phase of the Western Sahara conflict.
 Polisario declaration of independence – took place in 1976, establishing the Sahrawi Arab Democratic Republic.
 Sahrawi refugee camps – set up in the Tindouf Province, Algeria in 1975-76 for Sahrawi refugees fleeing from Moroccan forces.  With most refugees still living in the camps, the refugee situation is among the most protracted ones worldwide.
 First Battle of Amgala (1976) – Units from the Algerian Army were attacked by units from the Royal Moroccan Armed Forces on the night of 27 January.  Algeria claimed their troops were providing food and medical supplies to refugees at Amgala, while Morocco said the Algerian troops were heavily armed and were aiding Polisario.
 Settlement Plan – agreement made in 1991 between the Polisario Front and Morocco on the organization of a referendum, which would constitute an expression of self-determination for the people of Western Sahara, leading either to full independence, or integration with the kingdom of Morocco. It resulted in a cease-fire which remains in effect (more or less) to this day.
 United Nations Security Council Resolution 690 – adopted unanimously on 29 April 1991, established MINURSO (see below) to implement the Settlement Plan (see above).
 United Nations Mission for the Referendum in Western Sahara (MINURSO) – UN peacekeeping mission in Western Sahara established in 1991 under United Nations Security Council Resolution 690 as part of the Settlement Plan, which had paved way for a cease-fire in the conflict between Morocco and the Polisario Front (as the Sahrawi Arab Democratic Republic) over the contested territory of Western Sahara (formerly Spanish Sahara).
 Independence Intifada – series of disturbances, demonstrations and riots that broke out in May 2005 in the Moroccan-occupied parts of Western Sahara and south of Morocco.
 Gdeim Izik protest camp – protest camp in Western Sahara established by a group of Sahrawis on 9 October 2010 and lasting into November, with related incidents occurring in the aftermath of its dismantlement on 8 November. It has been suggested by Noam Chomsky, that the month-long protest encampment at Gdeim Izik constituted the start of the Arab Spring, traditionally considered to be the self-immolation of Mohamed Bouazizi in Tunisia on 17 December 2010.
 2011 Western Saharan protests – began on 25 February 2011 as a reaction to the failure of police to prevent anti-Sahrawi looting in the city of Dakhla, Western Sahara, and blossomed into protests across the territory. They were related to the Gdeim Izik protest camp in Western Sahara established the previous fall, which had resulted in violence between Sahrawi activists and Moroccan security forces and supporters.
 Former members of the Polisario Front

Demographics of Western Sahara 

Demographics of Western Sahara

Culture of the Sahrawi Arab Democratic Republic 

Culture of Western Sahara

National symbols
 National symbols of the Sahrawi Arab Democratic Republic
 Coat of arms of the Sahrawi Arab Democratic Republic
 Flag of the Sahrawi Arab Democratic Republic
 National anthem of the Sahrawi Arab Democratic Republic
 Public holidays in the Sahrawi Arab Democratic Republic

Culture
 Languages of Western Sahara
 National symbols of Western Sahara
 Coat of arms of Western Sahara
 Flag of Western Sahara
 National anthem of Western Sahara
 Public holidays in Western Sahara
 Religion in Western Sahara
 Christianity in Western Sahara
 Hinduism in Western Sahara
 Islam in Western Sahara
 Sikhism in Western Sahara
 World Heritage Sites in Western Sahara: None

Art in Western Sahara 
 Music of Western Sahara
 Sahrauis: The Music of the Western Sahara
 Television in Western Sahara

People of Western Sahara

Persons and personalities 

Djema'a
El-Ouali Mustapha Sayed
James Baker
Ma El Ainin
Marrack Goulding
Mohammed VI of Morocco
Mohamed Abdelaziz
Javier Pérez de Cuéllar

Sports in Western Sahara 

Sports in Western Sahara
 Football in Western Sahara
 Sahrawi Football Federation
 Sahrawi national football team
 Sahrawi Republic Cup

Economy and infrastructure of the Sahrawi Arab Democratic Republic 

Economy of Western Sahara
 Economic rank, by nominal GDP (2007):
Currency of Western Sahara: Dirham (Imposed in The Occupied Territories under duress and illegal military occupation)
ISO 4217: MAD
In Free Zone and Refugee Camps: Peseta Saharaui (de iure) 
ISO 4217: EHP
 (de facto) Euro, [[CFA Franc|Franco]], Dólar, Uguiya, Dinar
 Health in Western Sahara
 Transport in Western Sahara
 Airports in Western Sahara
 Rail transport in Western Sahara
 Roads in Western Sahara

Communications of SADR

Communications in Western Sahara
 Sahara Press Service
 Internet in Western Sahara
 .eh

Education in the Sahrawi Arab Democratic Republic 
Education in Western Sahara
 Zawiya
 Universities in Western Sahara
 University of Tifariti

See also 

 List of international rankings
 Outline of Africa
 Outline of geography

References

External links 

 Official SADR web pages
 
 Sahara Press Service (SPS) 
  RASD TV 
  SADR National Radio 
 SADR Oil & Gas 2005 

 Overviews
 BBC - Country profile: Western Sahara
 CIA World Factbook - Western Sahara
 

 News
 allAfrica.com - Western Sahara news headline links
 The Yahoo! Sahara Update group

 Special topics
 Western Sahara, Landmine Monitor Report 2003
  On the Baker Plan debate
 Western Sahara Project: archaeology and past environmental change in Western Sahara
 Association for a Free and Fair Referendum in Western Sahara (ARSO)

 Maps
  Minurso Deployment as of October 2006, Map No. 3691 Rev. 53 United Nations, October 2006 (Colour), Department of Peacekeeping Operations, Cartographic Section

 Others
 Association de soutien à un référendum libre et régulier au Sahara Occidental, a multilingual resource
 Moroccan Governmental website
 Western Sahara Online (pro-Polisario)--now a search site
 Western Sahara Online (pro-Morocco)
 Sahara-Update · News from and about Western Sahara
  

Sahrawi Arab Democratic Republic
Sahrawi Arab Democratic Republic
Western Sahara
Western Sahara-related lists